Theo Chocolate is an American chocolate maker headquartered in Seattle, Washington. Established in 2006, it is the first organic fair trade-certified cocoa producer in the United States.

Theo has sourced beans from the Congo, Costa Rica, the Dominican Republic, Ecuador, Madagascar, Peru, and Venezuela.

History

The business was established in 2006 by Jeff Fairhall and Joe Whinney in the Fremont neighborhood of Seattle. The business is located in the historic Fremont Trolley Barn at 3400 Phinney Avenue.

Jeff Fairhall, the founder of Seattle's Essential Baking Company, invested in the establishment of Theo Chocolate with Joe Whinney. When he was in his early 20s, Whinney volunteered with a small conservation foundation in Southern Belize that was looking at the way that communities cultivated their crops. He developed a passion for the Theobroma cacao plant and wanted to get into the business while supporting the farmers, and contacted 10 bean processors. One responded. While providing this business with organic materials and customers, Whinney was able to start saving up to found a chocolate business of his own.

The business struggled to find a good supply of organic cocoa beans and came to a halt in 2002. After finding an interested investor in Seattle, Washington, the decision was made to build the Theo Chocolate factory, named after the Theobroma cacao tree.

From 2004 to 2006 Fairhall sold all of his other business interests, retaining only Theo Chocolate. He published more than 30 advertisements in The Stranger about various religious ideas, revelations, and conspiracy theories. He also mentioned his use of magic mushrooms. Fairhall died of brain cancer in 2007.

In April 2018, Etienne Patout, a former Kellogg's executive, became the company's CEO.

Products
Theo Chocolate sells chocolate bars in six different categories: Classic, Fantasy, Limited Edition, Baking and Holiday. The company also sells caramels and specialty items.

Video case
Cengage Learning produced a 6:44-minute BizFlix video case titled "Theo Chocolate", which discusses the firm's fair trade practices and vertical integration.

References

American chocolate companies
Food and drink companies based in Seattle
Manufacturing companies based in Seattle
Fair trade
Organic chocolate
Organic farming organizations
Food and drink companies established in 2006
2006 establishments in Washington (state)